Larry Francis Drake (May 5, 1921 – July 14, 1985) was an American professional baseball player whose played for eight seasons (1941–1942; 1944–1949), mostly at the minor league level. He appeared in five Major League games as an outfielder and pinch hitter for the Philadelphia Athletics and Washington Senators. He attended Baylor University.

Drake played in one game for Philadelphia during the 1945 season, the last year of the World War II manpower shortage. He started the July 20 game against the Cleveland Indians in left field and struck out in his only two at bats before being replaced by a right-handed pinch hitter. He then returned to the minor leagues. Then, in 1948, he was recalled by Washington in September from the Double-A Southern Association and appeared in four games against his old team, the Athletics. On September 10, he started in right field and collected his only two Major League hits (both singles off Dick Fowler) and lone big-league run batted in, as the Athletics prevailed, 9–6.

In his five MLB games, Drake had 11 plate appearances and nine official at bats. He scored no runs, drew one base on balls and was credited with one sacrifice hit. He handled five total chances in the field without an error.

References

External links

1921 births
1985 deaths
Atlanta Crackers players
Baltimore Orioles (IL) players
Baseball players from Texas
Big Spring Bombers players
Boise Pilots players
Chattanooga Lookouts players
Columbia Reds players
Elmira Pioneers players
Jersey City Giants players
Knoxville Smokies players
Lamesa Dodgers players
Major League Baseball outfielders
Mobile Bears players
Philadelphia Athletics players
St. Hyacinthe Saints players
Sherman Twins players
Sherman–Denison Twins players
Toronto Maple Leafs (International League) players
Washington Senators (1901–1960) players
People from McKinney, Texas